Darkoneta is a genus of spiders that was first described by J. M. Ledford & C. E. Griswold in 2010.

Species
 it contains six species:
Darkoneta arganoi (Brignoli, 1974) – Mexico
Darkoneta garza (Gertsch, 1974) – USA
Darkoneta obscura (Gertsch, 1974) – Mexico
Darkoneta quetzal Ledford & Griswold, 2010 – Guatemala
Darkoneta reddelli Ledford & Griswold, 2010 – Mexico
Darkoneta stridulans (Platnick, 1994) (type) – Panama

References

Araneomorphae genera
Araneomorphae
Spiders of Central America
Spiders of North America